The 10th General Junta was the meeting of the General Junta, the parliament of the Principality of Asturias, with the membership determined by the results of the regional election held on 24 May 2015. The congress met for the first time on 15 June 2019.

Election
The 10th Asturian regional election was held on 24 May 2015. At the election the Spanish Socialist Workers' Party (PSOE) remained the largest party in the General Junta but fell short of a majority again.

History
The new parliament met for the first time on 26 June 2015 and after two rounds, Pedro Sanjurjo (PSOE) was re-elected as President of the General Junta.

Deaths, resignations and suspensions
The 10th General Junta has seen the following deaths, resignations and suspensions: 
 25 September 2015 - Fernando Goñi (PP) resigned after being appointed senator. David González Medina replaced him on 8 October 2015.
 29 September 2015 - Argimiro Rodríguez (Foro) and Esther Landa (Foro) resigned. Pedro Leal (Foro) and Isidro Martínez Oblanca (Foro) replaced them on 15 October 2015 and on 29 October 2015, respectively.
 20 December 2015 - Susana López Ares (PP), Isidro Martínez Oblanca (Foro) and Ignacio Prendes (Independent, Cs) resigned after being elected members of the Congress of Deputies. Rafael Alonso (PP), Carmen Fernández (Foro) and Armando Bartolomé (Cs) replaced them, respectively, on 4 February 2016. 
 5 September 2017 - Emma Ramos (PP) resigned. Gloria García (PP) replaced her on 15 September 2017.
 19 June 2018 - Cristina Coto (Foro) resigned after dissagrements with her party. Early that year, she also resigned as president and spokesperson of Foro. Patricia García (Foro) replaced her on 18 July 2018.
 21 January 2019 - Gaspar Llamzares (IU), leader of United Left in Asturias, resigned after political dissagrements with his party. Jaime Gareth Flórez replaced him on 8 February 2019.

Members

References

External links
Official website of the General Junta
All members of the General Junta

General Junta of the Principality of Asturias
2015 establishments in Spain